Alba Fucens was an ancient Italic town occupying a lofty location (1,000 m) at the foot of the Monte Velino, c. 6.5 km north of Avezzano, Abruzzo, central Italy. Its remains are today in the comune of Massa d'Albe.

History
It was originally a town of the Aequi, though on the frontier of the Marsi, but was occupied by a Latin colony (304 BC) owing to its strategic importance. It lay on a hill just to the north of the Via Valeria, which was probably prolonged beyond Tibur at this very period. In the Second Punic War Alba at first remained faithful, but afterwards refused to send contingents and was punished.

After this it became a regular place of detention for important state prisoners, such as Syphax of Numidia, Perseus of Macedonia, Bituitus, king of the Arverni. It was attacked by the allies in the Social War, but remained faithful to Rome; and its strong position rendered it a place of some importance in the civil wars. Its prosperity, in the imperial period, can only be inferred from the number of inscriptions found there. The town was completely destroyed by the Saracens in the 10th century.

Buildings

It is chiefly remarkable for its finely preserved fortifications. The external walls, which have a circuit of about 3 km, are constructed of polygonal masonry; the blocks are carefully jointed, and the faces smoothed. With our present knowledge of such constructions their date cannot certainly be determined. They are not preserved to any very considerable height; but the arrangement of the gates is clearly traceable; as a rule they come at the end of a long, straight stretch of wall, and are placed so as to leave the right side of any attacking force exposed. On the north there is, for a length of about 150 m, a triple line of defences of later date (possibly added by the Roman colonists), inasmuch as both the city wall proper, and the double wall thrown out in front of it are partly constructed of concrete, and faced with finer polygonal masonry (in which horizontal joints seem to be purposely avoided).

A mile to the north of the city a huge mound with a ditch on each side of it (but at a considerable distance from it) may be traced; for a couple of miles. Within the walls there are hardly any buildings of a later date. Excavations have only been made casually, though remains of buildings and of roads can be traced, and also an extensive system of underground passages perhaps connected with the defences of the place. The hill at the western extremity was occupied by a temple of the Tuscan order, into which was built the church of S. Pietro; this contains ancient columns, and some remarkably fine specimens of Cosmatesque work. It is the only monastic church in the Abruzzi in which the nave is separated from the aisles by ancient columns.

The collegiate church of S. Nicola, in the village, contains a remarkable staurotheca of the 11th (?) century, and a wooden triptych in imitation of the Byzantine style with enamels, of the 13th century.

Excavations
In the 20th century the Belgian academy at Rome carried out excavations at the site, under the direction of Joseph Mertens. This project led to a series of publications of the site and its remains.

People
 Naevius Sutorius Macro

Bibliography
J. Mertens. 1969. Alba Fucens 2 Rapports et études. Bruxelles: Rome Institut Historique Belge.

References

External links

 Academia Belgica, Archivio Mertens (Alba Fucens)

Roman sites of Abruzzo
Roman amphitheatres in Italy
Former populated places in Italy
303 BC
300s BC establishments
Polygonal masonry
Coloniae (Roman)
Roman Republic
Roman towns and cities in Abruzzo
Massa d'Albe
National museums of Italy